Socrates Norton Sherman (July 22, 1801 – February 1, 1873) was a U.S. Representative from New York, a physician, and an officer in the Union Army during the American Civil War.

Biography
Born in Barre, Vermont, Sherman attended the local grade schools and high school. He studied medicine and graduated from Castleton Medical College in 1824. He subsequently moved to Ogdensburg, New York, in 1825, and opened a medical practice.

Dr. Sherman was elected as a Republican to the Thirty-seventh Congress (He served from March 4, 1861 until March 3, 1863). He declined to be a candidate for renomination in the elections of 1862. During the latter half of the Civil War, Sherman mustered into the military service as a major and the surgeon of the Thirty-fourth Regiment, New York Volunteer Infantry. He mustered out on October 7, 1865, with the brevet rank of lieutenant colonel in the U.S. Volunteers.

After the war, Sherman resumed the practice of medicine in Ogdensburg, where he died on February 1, 1873. He was interred in Ogdensburg Cemetery.

References
 Retrieved on 2008-10-19

Notes

1801 births
1873 deaths
People of New York (state) in the American Civil War
Union Army surgeons
People from Barre, Vermont
Republican Party members of the United States House of Representatives from New York (state)
19th-century American politicians